Leucine-rich repeat-containing protein 4 is a protein that in humans is encoded by the LRRC4 gene.

This gene is significantly downregulated in primary brain tumors. The exact function of the protein encoded by this gene is unknown.

References

Further reading

External links 
 

LRR proteins